An off-stream reservoir is a reservoir that is not located on a streambed, and is supplied by a pipeline, aqueduct or an adjacent stream. San Luis Reservoir is the largest off-stream reservoir in the United States. Although it is located on a small stream, it gets the vast majority of its water from the California Aqueduct by pumping aqueduct water up-hill to the reservoir.

Reservoirs